Josée Lake (born ) is a Canadian paralympic gold medallist swimmer, thalidomide survivor, and president of the Thalidomide Victims Association of Canada.

Personal life
Lake was born in Montreal in 1963 or 1964. She has no right hand or foot, and her left foot has no arch and only three toes. She started to learn to swim at the age of five, having to travel long distances to find classes which would accept a child with a disability. She swam for Canada in the 1980 and 1984 paralympics, and retired from swimming in 1986. Later she worked as a social worker in the area of suicide prevention. She has three children.

Swimming career
At the 1980 Summer Paralympics she won gold in Women's 50 m Backstroke J, Women's 50 m Breaststroke J and Women's 50 m Freestyle J.

At the 1984 Summer Paralympics she won gold in the Women's 100 m Freestyle A9, the Women's 50 m Backstroke A9, the Women's 50 m Breaststroke A9 and the Women's 150 m Individual Medley A9.

In 2012 she was inducted into Swimming Canada's Circle of Excellence, an honour given to the "greatest Canadian swimmers of all time".

Thalidomide
In 2019 Lake became president of the Thalidomide Victims Association of Canada, a group for people suffering the effects of the drug thalidomide which was given to pregnant women and caused birth defects. She has said that she hopes "that TVAC will continue to use its voice to promote pharmacovigilance, so that the thalidomide tragedy will never be forgotten. I believe that by sharing our history, as Thalidomide survivors, TVAC can help make our world a much safer place for unborn children."

References

External links
 "November 25, 2014: Press Conference with Thalidomide survivors Mercedes Benegbi and Josee Lake, NDP MPs Libby Davies (Vancouver East, NDP Health Critic) and Djaouida Sellah (Saint-Bruno--Saint-Hubert)." video, 17 mins

1960s births
Living people
Canadian female medley swimmers
Paralympic swimmers of Canada
Canadian female freestyle swimmers
Canadian female backstroke swimmers
Canadian female breaststroke swimmers